The Odd Fellow Building or Odd Fellows Building, now known as Wolcott Galleria, is a historic building in Casper, Wyoming. It was built in 1952 and designed by architect Jan Wilking of local architectural firm Goodrich & Wilking.  Casper's economy was then doing well and this building, unusual for Casper, was built with an arcade of first floor shops.  The Odd Fellows used the second floor, which had a double-height ballroom.  There were offices on the third.

It was listed on the National Register of Historic Places in 2009.

This building is now known as the "Wolcott Galleria", and home to home to a number of retail shops, as well as a banquet hall.

References

External links
Casper Odd Fellows Building, at Wyoming History Encyclopedia
Odd Fellows Building, at Wyoming State Historic Preservation Office
Casper Odd Fellows Building, at WyoHistory.org, a Project of the Wyoming State Historical Society

Cultural infrastructure completed in 1952
Clubhouses on the National Register of Historic Places in Wyoming
Buildings and structures in Casper, Wyoming
Casper
National Register of Historic Places in Natrona County, Wyoming